Norma Jean is the debut, and only, solo studio album by American R&B singer Norma Jean Wright, released on Bearsville Records in 1978. The album was produced by Bernard Edwards and Nile Rodgers of the band Chic, and was the project directly following the band's successful self-titled debut album Chic, which featured Wright on vocals.

Norma Jean includes the singles "Saturday", a US R&B Top 20 hit (#15) in July 1978, "Having a Party" and "Sorcerer", and was followed by non-album single "High Society" (R&B #19, January 1980), also produced by the Chic team. Another track from the album, "I Like Love", was later sampled in Solitaire's 2004 single "I Like Love (I Love Love)".

The album was reissued on CD with five bonus tracks by Sequel Records in 2000. The CD was soon out of print and commanded high prices on the collectors' market until reissued again in 2011 with the 7" versions of "Sorcerer" and "Having a Party" added.

The album's best-known original song is "Saturday", which besides being a club hit in its own right, has produced charting cover versions by East 57th St featuring Donna Allen (1997, UK #29), Joey Negro featuring Taka Boom (2000, UK #41) and 100% featuring Jennifer John (2004, UK #28). A remixed version of the song also serves as the theme music for British entertainment show Saturday Night Takeaway

Track listing
All tracks written by Bernard Edwards and Nile Rodgers unless otherwise noted.
Side A:
"Saturday" (Bobby Carter, Edwards, Rodgers) – 6:06 
"Having a Party" (Sam Cooke) – 4:31 
"I Believe in You" (Chris Dawkins, Norman Whitehead) – 5:13
Side B: 
"Sorcerer" – 5:01 
"So I Get Hurt" – 4:50 
"This Is the Love" (Denzil Miller, Norma Jean Wright) – 3:09 
"I Like Love" – 5:48
Bonus tracks 2000 CD reissue: 
"Hold Me Lonely Boy" – 3:40 
"High Society" (12" Mix) – 6:09 
"Saturday Nite" (Single Mix) – 3:28 
"Sorcerer" (12" Mix) – 7:15 
"Having a Party" (12" Mix) (Sam Cooke) – 5:45

Personnel
 Norma Jean Wright – lead vocals, background vocals
 Luther Vandross – background vocals
 David Lasley – background vocals
 Alfa Anderson – background vocals
 Robin Clark – background vocals
 Diva Gray – background vocals
 Bernard Edwards – bass guitar, background vocals
 Nile Rodgers – guitars, background vocals
 Kenny Lehman – woodwinds
 Tony Thompson – drums
 David Friedman – tubular bells, vibraphone
 Robert Sabino – keyboards
 Andy Schwartz – keyboards
 Tom Coppola – keyboards
 George Young – flute, tenor saxophone
 Vito Rendace – flute, tenor saxophone
 Jon Faddis – trumpet
 Barry Rogers – trombone
 Sammy Figueroa – percussion
 Alfred Brown – strings contractor
 Gloria Agostini – harp
 Gene Orloff – string conductor

Production
 Bernard Edwards – record producer
 Nile Rodgers – producer
 Bob Clearmountain – engineer
 Marc Kreiner, Tom Cossie – executive production
 Norman Seeff – photography

References

Chic (band) albums
1978 debut albums
Albums produced by Nile Rodgers
Albums produced by Bernard Edwards
Bearsville Records albums